Auxiliary feedwater is a backup water supply system found in pressurized water reactor nuclear power plants (PWRs). This system, sometimes known as emergency feedwater, can be used to cool the reactor, if normal feedwater to the steam generators fails to work. It works by pumping water to the steam generators from reserve tanks or a larger body of water (e.g. lake, river, or ocean) to remove decay heat from the reactor by dumping non-radioactive steam to atmosphere or using this steam to drive turbine driven auxiliary feedwater pump(s). The auxiliary feedwater system in PWRs are often equipped with motor driven aux feedwater pumps, and, as an additional measure, turbine driven aux feedwater pump that is driven not by electricity but by steam generated by decay heat removal from the normal secondary side steam circuit of the plant. In contrast to emergency core cooling systems for loss-of-coolant accidents, the auxiliary feedwater system does not inject directly into the reactor core. Instead, it cools in an indirect manner by cooling the primary circuit with the reactor via the steam generators.

Nuclear technology